is a former Japanese football player.

References

External links

J. League (#5)

1988 births
Living people
Tokai Gakuen University alumni
Association football people from Nagano Prefecture
Japanese footballers
J2 League players
Matsumoto Yamaga FC players
Association football midfielders